The 1976 County Championship was the 77th officially organised running of the County Championship. Middlesex won the Championship title.

Table
10 points for a win
5 points to each side for a tie
5 points to side still batting in a match in which scores finish level
Bonus points awarded in first 100 overs of first innings
Batting: 150 runs - 1 point, 200 runs - 2 points 250 runs - 3 points, 300 runs - 4 points
Bowling: 3-4 wickets - 1 point, 5-6 wickets - 2 points 7-8 wickets - 3 points, 9-10 wickets - 4 points
No bonus points awarded in a match starting with less than 8 hours' play remaining.
The two first innings limited to a total of 200 overs. The side batting first limited to 100 overs. Any overs up to 100 not used by the side batting first could be added to the overs of the side batting second.
Position determined by points gained. If equal, then decided on most wins.
Each team plays 20 matches.
All counties are required to achieve an overall average of at least 19.5 overs per hour. In the calculation, two minutes will be allowed for each wicket taken. Counties failing to reach this average will be fined £1000, half to be paid by the club and half by the players. The fines to be assed after ten matches and at the end of the season. Club fines to go to the N.C.A., players fines to go to the Cricketers' Association.

 The match between Gloucs & Worcs at Bristol was abandoned without a ball being bowled and is not included in the table.

References

1976 in English cricket
County Championship seasons